S. G. Atkins House is a historic home located at Winston-Salem, Forsyth County, North Carolina.  The house was built about 1893, and is a two-story, three bay, frame dwelling with rear additions.  The front facade has a central gable and a hip-roofed porch. It was built by Dr. Simon Green Atkins, the founder of the Slater Industrial Academy for African-American students.  The house was converted to apartments in 1951.

It was listed on the National Register of Historic Places in 1979.

References

African-American history in Winston-Salem, North Carolina
Houses on the National Register of Historic Places in North Carolina
Houses completed in 1893
Houses in Winston-Salem, North Carolina
National Register of Historic Places in Winston-Salem, North Carolina